Richard Kadrey (born August 27, 1957) is a novelist, freelance writer, and photographer based in Austin, Texas.

Kadrey was born in New York City, New York.

Fiction 
Kadrey has written nineteen novels, including fifteen New York Times Best Sellers. Kadrey's other works include collaborative graphic novels and over 50 published short stories.

Sandman Slim series 
The first Sandman Slim novel was published in 2009. It is one of 13 books listed on Barnes & Noble’s “Best Paranormal Fantasy Novels of the Last Decade”. The story's main character, James "Sandman Slim" Stark, escapes from Hell to take his revenge on the people that killed his lover. He wanders a dark Los Angeles haunted by vampires and demons. After 11 years of combat as a gladiator against demons in Hell, he is more than prepared to fight back.

The second Sandman Slim novel, Kill the Dead, was released in October 2010. On October 18, 2011, the third installment of the Sandman Slim series was released, titled Aloha from Hell. "Devil in the Dollhouse: A Sandman Slim Story," was published as an eBook on July 31, 2012. The fourth novel, Devil Said Bang, was released August 28, 2012. Devil Said Bang takes place exactly 112 days after the end of Aloha from Hell. The fifth book in the series is called Kill City Blues and was published on July 30, 2013. In an essay written for Upcoming4.me, Kadrey revealed that the sixth book in the series would be called The Getaway God and it was published in summer 2014. The seventh book, Killing Pretty, was released in July 2015.  The eighth book, The Perdition Score, was released in June 2016. The ninth book, The Kill Society, was released in June 2017. The tenth book, Hollywood Dead, was released in August 2018. The eleventh book, Ballistic Kiss was released in August 2020. The 12th book, King Bullet, was released on August 17 of 2021.

In 2016, it was reported that Studio 8 acquired the rights to the series and were hoping to launch a franchise. In February 2018, it was announced that Chad Stahelski would be directing an adaptation of the first novel, with Kerry Williamson set to write the latest draft of the script.

Metrophage 
Metrophage, first published in 1988, is a cyberpunk novel set in a dystopic future Los Angeles. It has been referred to in reviews as "one of the quintessential 1980s cyberpunk novels".

Dead Set 
On October 29, 2013, Kadrey released Dead Set, a novel dealing with an uninvited presence that has entered dreams of Zoe and her lost brother Valentine.

"Carbon Copy: Meet the First Human Clone" 
Kadrey's short story "Carbon Copy: Meet the First Human Clone" was filmed as After Amy, a 2001 made-for-television movie starring Bridget Fonda.

Non-fiction 
Kadrey's non-fiction books as a writer and/or editor include The Catalog of Tomorrow (2002), From Myst to Riven (1997), The Covert Culture Sourcebook and its sequel (1993 and 1994).

Kadrey hosted a live interview show on HotWired in the 1990s called Covert Culture. He was an editor at print magazines Shift and Future Sex, and at online magazines Signum and Stim. He has published articles about art, culture and technology in publications including Wired, Omni, Mondo 2000, the San Francisco Chronicle, SF Weekly, Ear, Artforum, ArtByte, Bookforum, World Art, Whole Earth Review, Reflex, Science Fiction Eye, Street Tech, and Interzone.

Kadrey was the co-founder of the now-defunct Dead Media Project along with cyberpunk author and futurist Bruce Sterling.

Works

Sandman Slim series
 Sandman Slim (2009)
 Kill The Dead (2010)
 Aloha from Hell (2011)
 "Devil in the Dollhouse" (short story, 2012)
 Devil Said Bang (2012)
 Kill City Blues (2013)
 The Getaway God (2014)
 Killing Pretty (2015)
 The Perdition Score (2016)
 The Kill Society (2017)
 Hollywood Dead (2018)
 Ballistic Kiss (2020)
 King Bullet (2021)

Coop novels
 The Everything Box (2016)
 The Wrong Dead Guy (2017)

Other novels
 Metrophage (1988)
 Kamikaze L'Amour: A Novel of the Future (1995)
 Butcher Bird: A Novel of the Dominion (2007)
 Dead Set (2013)
 The Grand Dark (2019)

References

External links
 Richard Kadrey's Web site
 After Amy IMDB entry for the film After Amy
 
 Interview at FantasyLiterature.Com

Living people
1957 births
21st-century American novelists
Wired (magazine) people
Writers from San Francisco
Cyberpunk writers
American male novelists
21st-century American male writers
Urban fantasy writers